A list of Portuguese films that were first released in 2005.

See also
2005 in Portugal

References

2005
Lists of 2005 films by country or language
2005 in Portugal